Indigenous inhabitants refers to the people descended through the male line from a person who was in 1898, before Convention for the Extension of Hong Kong Territory was signed, a resident of an established village in the New Territories of Hong Kong. They have special rights to preserve their customs. When the sovereignty of Hong Kong was transferred from the United Kingdom to the People's Republic of China in 1997, these special rights were preserved under the Hong Kong Basic Law.

Article 40 of the Basic Law
 The lawful traditional rights and interests of the indigenous inhabitants of the "New Territories" shall be protected by the Hong Kong Special Administrative Region.

Special rights 

Special rights are restricted to the village that the indigenous inhabitant is from. In order to protect the tradition of villages, male indigenous inhabitants have the right to apply for small house, known as Ting Uk (Hong Kong Hakka: Den1 Vuk5). Properties are only inherited by male members of a village. The interests of  indigenous inhabitants are represented by the Heung Yee Kuk (Hong Kong Hakka: Hiong1 Ngi4 Kiuk6).

In 2021, the Liber Research Community found sites of suspected of illegal collusion between developers and villagers, and additionally found villager land that could otherwise be used for housing in Hong Kong, contrary to the government's claim that the land was "unfit" for development.

People living on boats 

People have been living on boats in the New Territories for generations, and they do not usually own land or houses.  They have no special rights because the Hong Kong government since 1898 only recognises established villages (Hong Kong Hakka: Ngin4ko3 Hiong1con1).

Conflicts between indigenous and non-indigenous inhabitants 

As a result of a large influx of non-indigenous inhabitants into the rural villages, conflicts between indigenous and non-indigenous inhabitants are surfacing.  Because the management of a village was only in the hand of indigenous inhabitants, non-indigenous inhabitants could not participate in the matters of the village.

The indigenous inhabitants of Hong Kong spoke Tanka, Hakka, Hoklo (closer to Teochew dialect than Hokkien, which is usually called "Hoklo" as well) and Yue Chinese Weitou dialect which is different from the newcomers who spoke contemporary standard Cantonese.

Conflicts between villages 
"Internally, inter-village feuds were common. They amounted to mini-wars, often lasting for years and marked by deaths in armed struggles and the destruction of houses and crops. The causes of strife were often rooted in access to, or protection of, precious water for irrigation, and other economic assets, such as the control of ferries and markets. Disputes over fung-shui of settlements or ancestral graves were not uncommon because the belief of sitings being directly linked with prosperity or adversity. Superior geomantic skills were in demand, since they could be used to injure the fung-shui of another village, lineage, branch lineage or family, or even to drive out earlier settlers." (Hayes, 2012)

See also 
Hong Kong Punti people (also known as Weitou people)
Hong Kong Hakka people
Hong Kong Tanka people
Hokkien people
Convention for the Extension of Hong Kong Territory
Housing in Hong Kong

References

Hayes, J. (2012). The great difference. Hong Kong: Hong Kong University Press, p.7.

Demographics of Hong Kong
New Territories, Indigenous inhabitant of the
Housing in Hong Kong